Look at Me may refer to:

Film
 Look at Me (2004 film), a French drama
 Look at Me, a 2008 film directed by Dan Turner
 Look at Me (2022 film), a documentary film on rapper and singer XXXTentacion

Music

Albums
 Look at Me: The Album, by XXXTentacion, 2022
 Look at Me (album), by Cadillac Don & J-Money, 2006
 Look at Me, or the title song (see below) by the Moments, 1975
 Look at Me, by Pace Wu, 2005

Songs
 "Look at Me" (Geri Halliwell song), 1999
 "Look at Me" (John Lennon song), 1970
 "Look at Me" (Mirrors song), 2009
 "Look at Me" (XXXTentacion song), 2015
 "Look at Me (I'm in Love)", by the Moments, 1975
 "Look at Me (When I Rock Wichoo)", by Black Kids, 2008
 "Look at Me", by Alan Jackson from Billy: The Early Years, 2008
 "Look at Me", by Band-Maid from Brand New Maid, 2016
 "Look at Me", by Buddy Holly from Buddy Holly, 1958
 "Look at Me", by Dobie Gray, 1963
 "Look at Me", by Engelbert Humperdinck, 1977
 "Look at Me", by FFS from FFS, 2015
 "Look at Me", by Freddie Gibbs and The Alchemist from Alfredo, 2020
 "Look at Me", by Sugababes from One Touch, 2000
 "Look at Me", by Sum 41 from Underclass Hero, 2007
 "Look at Me", by Why Don't We from The Good Times and the Bad Ones, 2021

Other media 
 Look at Me (new Capitoline Wolf), a 2011 art installation by Paweł Wocial
 Look at Me (novel), a 2001 novel by Jennifer Egan

See also 
 Look at Me Now (disambiguation)
 Watch Me (disambiguation)